Mohammad Saber Rohparwar is an Afghan retired footballer. He was the captain of the Afghanistan national team until 1980. He has been Afghanistan's most successful football player, scoring 25 goals as a footballer in his national team.

Furthermore, he was the coach of the Kaur club. During his time as a coach he trained players such as Najib Kohyar.

In 1980, during the Soviet invasion and two years after the communist war, he fled to Hamburg in Germany and founded a taxi business. He then created a local Afghan football club called Ariana SV which he is currently a chairman.

His son Rohollah Rohparwar is also a footballer.

References 

Living people
Afghan footballers
Association football forwards
Year of birth missing (living people)
Afghanistan international footballers